George Lesyw (July 5, 1957 – March 5, 2005) was an American soccer forward who played three seasons in the Major Indoor Soccer League. He was born in Philadelphia, Pennsylvania.

Lesyw graduated from Cardinal Dougherty High School in Philadelphia.  He then attended Temple University, where he played on the men's soccer team from 1975 to 1978.  His twenty-six career goals puts him sixth on the Temple Owls career goals list.  He was a 1978 First Team All American soccer player.  In 1978, Lesyw played for the U.S. team at the World University Games.  In 1979, he signed with the Philadelphia Fever of the Major Indoor Soccer League and played three seasons with the Fever.

In 1982, he became the head coach of the Philadelphia Ukrainians.

He died on March 5, 2005.

References

External links
 MISL stats

1957 births
2005 deaths
American soccer coaches
American soccer players
Major Indoor Soccer League (1978–1992) players
Philadelphia Fever (MISL) players
Temple Owls men's soccer players
Soccer players from Philadelphia
American people of Ukrainian descent
All-American men's college soccer players
Association football forwards